Valley Center may refer to:

Places
Valley Centre, Saskatchewan, Canada
Valley Center, California, United States
Valley Center, Kansas, United States
Valley Center Township, Sedgwick County, Kansas, United States

Organizations
 Clinton Valley Center, psychiatric hospital located in Michigan
 Great Valley Center,  a nonprofit organization working to expand California's development growth

See also
Center Valley, Pennsylvania
Valley River Center